The China Railways JF3 (解放3, Jiěfàng, "liberation") class steam locomotive was a class of 2-8-2 steam locomotives operated by the China Railway, built by the Škoda Works in Czechoslovakia in 1927–1930.

History
These locomotives were originally built for the Qike Railway, the Huhai Railway, and the Sitao Railway. After the Japanese established the puppet state of Manchukuo, these and other privately owned railways in the territory of Manchukuo were nationalised to create the Manchukuo National Railway, which designated these the Mikani (ミカニ) class. In 1938 they were reclassified Mikasa (ミカサ) class.

After the end of the Pacific War, these locomotives were passed on to the Republic of China Railway. After the establishment of the People's Republic of China, China Railways designated them ㄇㄎ3 (MK3) class in 1951, and subsequently 解放3 (JF3) class in 1959.

Postwar
The last of these locomotives were retired in 1990, and one, JF3 2558, is preserved at the Shenyang Steam Locomotive Museum.

See also
List of locomotives in China
China Railways JF13: in common with JF3 of manufacturer.

References

2-8-2 locomotives
Škoda locomotives
Railway locomotives introduced in 1927
Steam locomotives of China
Standard gauge locomotives of China
Rolling stock of Manchukuo
Freight locomotives